"Radioactive" is the only single released from the Kiss solo album Gene Simmons. The song is written by Gene Simmons and produced by Simmons and Sean Delaney. Released in 1979, the song was recorded in the spring of 1978. "Radioactive" reached #47 on the Billboard charts during an 8-week run between April and May 1979. When the single was released, a limited-edition red vinyl 45 rpm album was made available.

"Radioactive" features Bob Seger and Aerosmith guitarist Joe Perry. Approximately one minute of the song was edited from the album version for the single, subsequently removing the Prelude, which features musician Janis Ian on vocals.

Cash Box said that it has "heavy rhythm guitar work, stiff beat, good singing and good hook."

Personnel
Gene Simmons – lead vocals
Steve Lacey – guitar
Joe Perry – guitar
John Shane Howell - classical guitar
Neil Jason – bass 
Eric Troyer – piano
Allan Schwartzberg - drums
Bob Seger – backing vocals
Janis Ian – backing vocals on Prelude (not released on single)
Ron Frangipane - arranger of Prelude (not released on single)

Chart history

References

1979 singles
1978 songs
Songs written by Gene Simmons
Casablanca Records singles
Kiss (band) songs
Gene Simmons songs